Coventry Skydome is a 3,000-seat multi-purpose arena in Coventry, England.

History

Ice Hockey 
The arena is the current home of Elite League ice hockey franchise the Coventry Blaze.

Ice Skating 
The arena hosts classes from the International School of Skating.

Professional Wrestling 
The arena hosted several large professional wrestling shows not long after its opening, and established itself on the British wrestling circuit. In 2005, the venue hosted a WWE event, and a couple of years later hosted TNA Wrestling and Pro Wrestling Noah events in 2008, with TNA returning to the venue as part of its Maximum Impact tour in 2010. The venue also hosted What Culture Pro-Wrestling in 2017. WWE would return to the venue in 2019 with its NXT UK brand.

Music 
The arena host occasional music concerts and performances. Performances include UB40 and the SAMA African Music Festival featuring Winky D, Mafikizolo.

Notes

External links
 

Sports venues in Coventry
Indoor arenas in England
Indoor ice hockey venues in England
Sports venues completed in 1999
Netball venues in England
1999 establishments in England